The Compagnie van Verre (meanings "long-distance company") was one of the forerunner companies that were later merged (united) into the Dutch East India Company.

History
It was set up in 1594 by nine citizens of Amsterdam, to break Portugal's monopoly on the pepper trade.  To do this, it sent an expedition of three heavily armed ships and a pinnace under the leadership of Cornelis de Houtman, with orders to break into the trade.  (Cornelis' brother Frederik also worked for the company.) On 2 April 1595 the ships set off from Texel, with 248 officers and men on board.  The expedition (which became known as the Eerste schipvaart) followed the routes described by Jan Huygen van Linschoten after he had made the journey in the pay of the Portuguese.  On 6 June 1596 the ships arrived at Bantam, the most important pepper port on Java.  During the return trip, on 11 January 1597, the Amsterdam was badly damaged and had to be left behind at the island of Bawean.  On 14 August 1597 the expedition arrived back in Amsterdam with only 87 survivors.  The voyage was not a success commercially, but it proved that not only the Portuguese had the potential to trade in pepper.

In 1598 the Compagnie van Verre merged with the Nieuwe Compagnie and in 1597 with the Oude Compagnie.  The resulting company then merged with the Nieuwe Brabantsche Compagnie in 1601 to form the Verenigde Amsterdamse Compagnie, which in turn merged with many other companies (including the Verenigde Zeeuwse Compagnie) in 1602 into the Dutch East India Company (VOC), retaining a room in the VOC's chambers in Amsterdam.

16th century in Amsterdam
History of the Dutch East India Company
1594 establishments in Europe
1598 disestablishments in Europe
Pepper trade
Companies of the Dutch Republic